John Arthur Edward Herbert  (12 October 1818 – 18 August 1895) was Deputy Lieutenant for the County of Monmouthshire. He was also High Sheriff of Monmouthshire in 1849.

Family
John Arthur Edward Jones was born  on 12 October 1818. His father was John Jones of Llanarth Court and his mother was Lady Harriet James Plunkett, daughter of Arthur Plunkett, 8th Earl of Fingall.

On 2 October 1848 he changed his surname to Herbert by Royal sign-manual.

On 12 November 1846 he married the Honourable Augusta Charlotte Elizabeth Hall, daughter of Benjamin Hall, 1st Baron Llanover. The children from this marriage were:
Henrietta Mary Arianwen Herbert (26 July 1848), married the Honourable Walter Constable Maxwell on 24 November 1898 
Florence Catherine Mary Herbert (17 April 1850), married Joseph Monteith
Ivor John Caradoc Herbert (16 July 1851), became Major General (army), MP, ennobled as 1st Baron Treowen
Arthur James Herbert (22 August 1855), MA, married Helen Louise Gammell, daughter of William Gammell of Rhode Island, became a diplomat, envoy to Norway
Edward Bleiddian Herbert (23 January 1858), married the Honourable Mary Elizabeth Dalberg Acton, daughter of John Dalberg-Acton, 1st Baron Acton, became Lieutenant-Colonel (army)
Stephen Sulien Charles Herbert (18 December 1864)

References

1818 births
1895 deaths
Deputy Lieutenants of Monmouthshire
High Sheriffs of Monmouthshire